The molecular formula C15H12N2O2 (molar mass: 252.27 g/mol, exact mass: 252.0899 u) may refer to:

 Oxcarbazepine
 Phenytoin (PHT)

Molecular formulas